The Sea Wall is a 280-mile seawall that runs along much of Guyana's coastline, including all of the coastline in the capital city of Georgetown.  It protects settlements in the coastal areas of Guyana, most of which are below sea level at high tide.

Construction

Seawalls are necessary because of constant erosion of land by the sea. Historians note that two estates, Kierfield and Sandy Point, known to be existing in 1792 north of the present Georgetown Seawall, were completely washed away by 1804.

Tables of erosion and accretion, started by G. O. Case and maintained by the government, showed that accretion in the early 1840s was followed by erosion in the late 1840s. By 1855, the great Kingston Flood took place when the sea-dam, an earthen wall, was breached. It inundated the Kingston ward of Georgetown and washed away Camp House (the former residence for governors of the colony). 

It was after this catastrophe that the sea wall between Fort William Frederick and the Round House was started in 1858. Built principally by convict labor with granite from the Penal Settlement at Mazaruni (now Mazaruni Prison), the first section, which ran from Fort Groyne to Round House was completed by 1860. In 1874, the Public Works department of British Guiana committed to the construction of a continuous wall from Camp Street to Kitty.  By 1882, the Sea Wall had been extended to reach as far as Unity Village and it was completed in 1892

Further history 
In 1903 the Georgetown Seawall Bandstand was built with funds subscribed by the public as a memorial to Queen Victoria. The shelter north of the bandstand, called the Koh-i-noor Shelter, was erected in 1903.

Serious flooding resulting from breaches in the sea wall took place at Enmore in 1955, at Buxton in 1959, and at Bladen Hall in 1961.

See also 

 East Demerara Water Conservancy
 Water supply and sanitation in Guyana
 2005 Georgetown flood

References

Seawalls
Buildings and structures in Guyana